Punjab Renewable Energy Systems Pvt. Ltd. (PRESPL) is an Indian biomass-based renewable energy company involved in biomass aggregation and supply chain management. The company provides fuel to biomass power plants, independent power producers (IPPs) and process industries generating power to run their operations. This process is done by burning biomass to produce heat, steam and electricity. PRESPL works with biomass power, renewable energy, waste management systems, briquette manufacturing and biomass to Bio-CNG projects.

References 

Renewable energy
Renewable energy companies of India
Biofuel in India